Mark Raymond Woodforde, OAM (born 23 September 1965) is a former professional tennis player from Australia. He is best known as one half of "The Woodies", a doubles partnership with Todd Woodbridge.

Woodforde was born in Adelaide, and joined the men's professional tennis ATP Tour in 1984. Woodforde won four singles titles, including his hometown Adelaide tournament twice. His best singles result in a Grand Slam was reaching the semi-final of the Australian Open in 1996, his 38th Grand Slam singles tournament, which remains a record for the longest time taken to reach a maiden semi-final. Woodforde is best known for his doubles success, having won twelve Grand Slam doubles titles in his career – one French Open, two Australian Opens, three US Opens, and a record six Wimbledons. Eleven of these victories came as a member of the Woodies, and he won the 1989 US Open doubles with John McEnroe. He also won five Grand Slam mixed doubles titles – one French Open, two Australian Opens, one US Open, and one Wimbledon; thus making an overall total of 17 Grand Slam doubles titles. He reached the world No. 1 doubles ranking in November 1992.

He enjoyed the greatest success of his career when playing men's doubles with Woodbridge, combining his left-hand baseline play with Woodbridge's swift volleying reflexes at the net. They were the ATP Doubles Team of the Year four times, and all together the Woodies won 61 ATP doubles tournaments (Woodforde won 67 in his career).

Woodforde's other career highlights included a gold medal at the 1996 Atlanta Olympics, and a silver medal at the 2000 Sydney Olympics. Woodforde was awarded the Medal of the Order of the Australia in the 1997 Australia Day Honours "for service to sport as gold medallist at the Atlanta Olympic Games, 1996".

Woodforde played for the Australian Davis Cup Team in three Davis Cup finals, including teaming with Woodbridge to clinch the 1999 win over France in Paris to give Australia its first Davis Cup victory in 13 years.

Woodforde retired from professional tennis in 2000 after a Davis Cup final loss to Spain, and was appointed the coach of Australia's Fed Cup team in 2003. He has since provided commentary for tennis on Fox Sports and ESPN.

In January 2010 on Australia Day, the Woodies were inducted to the Australian Tennis Hall of Fame for their achievements in tennis. As a part of the induction ceremony, their bronzed statues were placed with other great Australian tennis players at Melbourne Park.

In 2014, alongside Woodbridge, the International Tennis Federation (ITF) presented him with its highest accolade, the Philippe Chatrier award, for his contributions to tennis.

Grand Slam finals

Doubles: 16 (12 titles, 4 runners-up)
By winning the 2000 French Open, Woodforde completed the career Grand Slam.

Mixed doubles: 7 (5 titles, 2 runners-up)

Career finals

Doubles (67–24)

Singles (4 titles, 5 runner-ups)

Doubles performance timeline

References

External links
 
 
 
 

1965 births
Living people
Australian expatriate sportspeople in the United States
Australian male tennis players
Australian Open (tennis) champions
French Open champions
Olympic gold medalists for Australia
Olympic silver medalists for Australia
Olympic tennis players of Australia
Tennis players from Adelaide
Sportspeople from Riverside County, California
Australian tennis commentators
Tennis people from California
Tennis players at the 1996 Summer Olympics
Tennis players at the 2000 Summer Olympics
US Open (tennis) champions
Wimbledon champions
Olympic medalists in tennis
Recipients of the Medal of the Order of Australia
Grand Slam (tennis) champions in mixed doubles
Grand Slam (tennis) champions in men's doubles
Medalists at the 1996 Summer Olympics
Medalists at the 2000 Summer Olympics
Novak Djokovic coaches
International Tennis Hall of Fame inductees
ATP number 1 ranked doubles tennis players
ITF World Champions
Sport Australia Hall of Fame inductees